Fritz Kühl (born 7 May 1935) is a German athlete. He competed at the 1960 Summer Olympics and the 1964 Summer Olympics.

References

External links
 

1935 births
Living people
Athletes (track and field) at the 1960 Summer Olympics
Athletes (track and field) at the 1964 Summer Olympics
German male shot putters
German male discus throwers
Olympic athletes of the United Team of Germany
Place of birth missing (living people)
20th-century German people